Ash Ridge is an unincorporated community located in the towns of Bloom and Forest, Richland County, Wisconsin, United States.

References

Unincorporated communities in Richland County, Wisconsin
Unincorporated communities in Wisconsin